Heioab is a mountain in the Diamond Restricted Aerea, also called Sperrgebiet, in the southwestern part of Namibia. It reaches a height of 1,090 m. Its extent is about 7 km × 10 km.

20 km northwest of  Heioab is Mount Höchster.

Several parts of the mountain range are covered with sand which is blown there by sandstorms. The average yearly rainfall in this area of the Namib amounts to just a few millimetres.

The bushes to be found in the mountains just survive because of the mist, which sometimes is formed above the cold Atlantic and then during daytime drifts far into the desert. The few Camel Thorn trees take their water from deep underground accumulations.

External links

References 

Mountains of Namibia
Geography of ǁKaras Region